Aaruchaur  is a former Village Development Committee in Syangja District Nepal. At the time of the 1991 Nepal census, it had a population of 2,956 people living in 760 individual households. After the dissolutions of VDC, it was merged with other existing VDCs to form Arjun Chaupari Rural Municipality,ward number-5.

References

External links
UN map of the municipalities of Syangja District

Populated places in Syangja District